Casilla is a Spanish surname, and may refer to:

Alexi Casilla (born 1984), Dominican Major League Baseball infielder
José Antonio Casilla (born 1979), Spanish volleyball player 
Kiko Casilla (born 1986), Spanish footballer
Robert Casilla (born 1959), American artist and illustrator
Santiago Casilla (born 1980), Dominican Major League Baseball relief pitcher

See also
Pabellón Municipal de Deportes La Casilla, 5000-seat arena in Bilbao, Spain

Spanish-language surnames